This is a list of countesses of Flanders by marriage.

Countess of Flanders

House of Flanders, 862–1119

House of Estridsen, 1119–1127

House of Normandy, 1127–1128

House of Metz, 1128–1194

House of Hainaut, 1194–1278

House of Dampierre, 1247–1405

House of Valois-Burgundy, 1405–1482

House of Habsburg, 1482–1700

House of Bourbon, 1700–1706

House of Habsburg, 1706–1780

House of Habsburg-Lorraine, 1780–1795

House of Saxe-Coburg and Gotha, 1840–2002

See also 
List of Dutch consorts

Sources
FLANDERS

 
Flemish nobility
Flanders
Flanders
Flanders
Flanders
Flanders
Flanders